Don Zara del Fogo: a mock-romance is a 1656 book in prose and verse by the English author Samuel Holland.

Book 

Don Zara del Fogo was written by Samuel Holland and printed by "T.W." for Thomas Vere in London in 1656. It was subtitled "a mock-romance / written originally in the Brittish tongue, and made English by a person of much honor, Basilius Musophilus ; with a marginall comment, expounding the hard things of the history". It is dedicated "to the most Nobly accomplished, ROBERT, THOMAS, and JOHN SPENCER, Esquires". 

It was reprinted in 1656 under the title Wit and fancy in a maze. The book was then published in 1660 under the title of Romancio-Mastrix.

Another edition was published in 1719; it was titled The Spaniard: Or, Don Zara del Fogo: Translated From the Original Spanish by Basilius Musophilus.

The text, a pastiche of Spanish romances such as Don Quixote, is in three "books", each of six chapters, containing a combination of prose and verse. Chapter 3 of the third book consists of "Venus and Adonis: A Masque", with its own epilogue.

Chapter 1 begins with this sentence:

In literature 

Don Zara is an early source for the use of the term "Orc" (spelt "Orke") for an ogre-like monster in English.

References

Sources 

 
  – "these high-quality digital scans of original works are available via print-on-demand"

External links 

 Oxford Text Archive at the Bodleian Library

1656 books